Torrent Pharmaceuticals Ltd is an Indian multinational pharmaceutical company, owned by Torrent Group and headquartered in Ahmedabad. It was promoted by U. N. Mehta, initially as Trinity Laboratories Ltd, and was later renamed Torrent Pharmaceuticals Ltd.

Torrent Pharmaceuticals operates in more than 40 countries with over 2000 product registrations globally. Torrent Pharma is active in the therapeutic areas of Cardiovascular (CV), central nervous system (CNS), gastro-intestinal, diabetology, anti-infective and pain management segments. It has also forayed into the therapeutic segments of nephrology and oncology while also strengthening its focus on gynecology and pediatric segments.
Drug firm Torrent Pharmaceuticals on 23 July 2019 reported a 32.51 percent rise in its consolidated net profit to Rs 216 crore for the quarter ended 30 June, mainly on account of robust sales in most geographies.

Subsidiaries 
It has 7 fully owned subsidiaries:
 Heumann Pharma GmbH & Co Generica KG, Germany
 Torrent Pharma GmbH, Germany
 Torrent do Brasil Ltda., Brazil
 ZAO Torrent Pharma, Russia
 Torrent Pharma Inc., United States
 Torrent Pharma Philippines Inc., Philippines
 Torrent Pharma Canada Inc., Canada
 Torrent Pharma UK United Kingdom

Torrent Pharmaceuticals acquired Heumann GmbH, a Pfizer company, in 2005.

Operations
The company's key areas are Formulations, API, Drug Discovery, Marketing and Sales of Drugs. Its operations locations are:
 Manufacturing plant at Dahej, Gujarat 
 Manufacturing plant at Pithampur, Madhya Pradesh
 Manufacturing plant at Indrad, Mehsana, Gujarat
 Manufacturing plant at Baddi, Himachal Pradesh
 3 Manufacturing plant at Rang-Po,(Sikkim)
 Research Centre, Ahmedabad-Gandhinagar region, Gujarat
 Corporate Office, beside sales India, off. Ashram Road, [Ahmedabad]- Gujarat
 Manufacturing plant at Visakhapatnam (Andhra Pradesh)

Recalls
In 2018, Torrent Pharmaceuticals recalled tablets containing valsartan and losartan due to the detection of N-nitrosodimethylamine (NDMA) and N-nitrosodiethylamine (NDEA) respectively which are probable human carcinogens.

In September 2019, the FDA issued notice of a sixth product recall of losartan by Torrent Pharmaceuticals when certain batches of losartan contained the contaminant, N-methylnitrosobutyric acid (NMBA), above acceptable daily intake levels determined by the FDA.

References

External links

Companies based in Ahmedabad
Pharmaceutical companies of India
Pharmaceutical companies established in 1959
Indian brands
Torrent Group
1959 establishments in Bombay State
Indian companies established in 1959
Companies listed on the National Stock Exchange of India
Companies listed on the Bombay Stock Exchange